Goran R. Lingmerth (born November 11, 1964 in Nässjö, Sweden) is a former professional American football player; a placekicker for the Cleveland Browns in 1987. He played college football at Northern Arizona University in Flagstaff.

After football
After a season in the NFL, Lingmerth completed his degree at NAU and then worked in the golf industry for Ping.

Personal
Lingmerth's first wife was professional golfer Heather Farr (1965–1993), who succumbed to cancer at age 28. His nephew is PGA Tour player

References

External links
 

1964 births
Cleveland Browns players
Living people
Swedish players of American football
Swedish emigrants to the United States
Northern Arizona Lumberjacks football players
People from Nässjö Municipality
Sportspeople from Jönköping County